Dealz is a chain of discount retail stores predominantly in Ireland, Spain and Poland, offering a range of general merchandise products, the majority of which are at the fixed price of €1.50 (in Ireland and Spain); £1.20; or zl 6.-

The stores are operated by South African company Steinhoff, through its subsidiary Poundland.

History 
The first two Dealz stores were opened in Blanchardstown and Portlaoise in September 2011, and by September 2013, the chain had expanded to 28 stores. Additional Dealz stores also opened in islands off of Britain: one in Douglas, Isle of Man and another in Kirkwall, Orkney. Dealz expanded to these British islands because it was offering Poundland products for £1 and £1.20. In September 2012, a store opened in Kirkwall, but this became a Poundland/Pep&Co store on 26 May 2018.

Euroland

It was decided that the name 'Euroland' was not going to be used as it avoided the impact of price volatility in the region and because potential customers did not like the name during the European debt crisis. Also, a chain store of 45 shops with the name "Euroland" already existed in the Netherlands, making it difficult to use the name. Instead of everything being the same price, like the current Poundland model, there will be different prices. As well as offering the Poundland mix of known brands such as Kelloggs, Cadbury's and Kodak, the stores will also sell locally sourced products including milk, eggs and crisps. In July 2014, Poundland opened their first store in Torremolinos, Spain under the Dealz España name. Dealz is a wholly owned subsidiary of the UK retailer Poundland, and ultimately owned by Steinhoff International, listed in Germany and South Africa.

References

External links 
 Official website

Retail companies of Ireland
Retail companies established in 2011
Discount stores